The Eastern Independent League (EIL) is composed of eleven New England preparatory schools that compete athletically and academically. The EIL's eleven members  compete in a number of sports in the New England Prep School Athletic Conference (NEPSAC).

Members
The Eastern Independent League is composed of 11 schools.

Sports
Sports played in the EIL include:
 Basketball (boys' and girls')
 Baseball
 Cross Country (boys' and girls')
 Field Hockey
 Golf (boys' only)
 Ice Hockey (girls' only)
 Lacrosse (boys' and girls')
 Soccer (boys' and girls')
 Softball
 Squash (girls' only)
 Swimming (boys' and girls')
 Tennis (boys' and girls')
 Track and Field (boys' and girls')
 Volleyball
 Wrestling

Boys' Basketball 
The EIL has been one of the most competitive boys' basketball leagues in New England over the years. Recently, however, the league has been dominated by Beaver Country Day School who won every championship between the 2009–10 and 2018–19 seasons.

References

High school sports conferences and leagues in the United States